
Year 277 (CCLXXVII) was a common year starting on Monday (link will display the full calendar) of the Julian calendar. At the time, it was known as the Year of the Consulship of Probus and Paulinus (or, less frequently, year 1030 Ab urbe condita). The denomination 277 for this year has been used since the early medieval period, when the Anno Domini calendar era became the prevalent method in Europe for naming years.

Events 
 By place 
 Roman Empire 
 Emperor Probus travels with his army west across the Sea of Marmara (Turkey), and through the provinces of Thrace, Moesia, and Pannonia to defeat the Goths along the lower Danube. He acquires from the troops the title of Gothicus.
 Probus enters Rome, to have his position as Emperor ratified by the Senate.

 China 
 Tuoba Xilu succeeds his father Tuoba Liwei, as chieftain of the Tuoba clan.

Births 
 Justus of Beauvais, Gallo-Roman martyr (approximate date)
 Sima Ai, Chinese prince of the Jin Dynasty (d. 304)
 Zhang Mao, Chinese ruler of Former Liang (d. 324)

Deaths 
 Tuoba Liwei, chieftain of the Tuoba clan (China)

References